The Biocidal Products Directive (BPD) also known as the Biocides Directive is European Union Directive, (98/8/EC), which concerns biocides. It is officially known as Directive 98/8/EC of the European Parliament and of the Council of 16 February 1998 concerning the placing of biocidal products on the market. In 2013 the Biocidal Products Directive was superseded by The Biocidal Products Regulation (BPR, Regulation (EU) 528/2012).

Definition 
Biocide is defined in Article 2(1)(a) as "active substances and preparations containing one or more active substances, put up in the form in which they are supplied to the user, intended to destroy, deter, render harmless, prevent the action of, or otherwise exert a controlling effect on any harmful organism by chemical or biological means."

A biocidal product is a substance intending to destroy, deter, render harmless, prevent the action of, or exert a controlling effect on any harmful organism by any means other than mere physical or mechanical action. These products are highly regulated because of health and performance concerns. They first have to be legally regulated, and all products or substances on the market also have to be tested and certified in order to ensure their compliance with current directives and regulations.

The definition and the identification of the biocidal products, including their classifications, are crucial because they form the bases of the guidance documents and these also allow the systematic and easier association with the appropriate governing framework. For instance, those substances classified in the directive as cosmetics products immediately fall within the coverage of the Cosmetics Products Regulation 1223/2009.

EU biocides regulation

Biocidal products and active substances fall into four categories and twenty-three product-types that are all regulated by the EU under the Biocidal Products Directive. The substances have to be authorised before being used or sold on the EU market. Also, all treated products shall only contain authorised active substances. To be authorised, manufacturers or importers need to submit technical documentation on the products. The European Commission created and regularly updates the Biocidal Products Directive to ensure a high level of protection of human and animal health, as well as environmental protection.

A proposal (COM(2009)267) was put forward to repeal and replace the Directive 98/8/EC and it was adopted on June 12, 2009, by the European Commission. This proposed measure builds on the principles of the older directive, with the aim of improving "the functioning of the internal market in biocidal products while maintaining a high level of environmental and human health protection."

Classification 
The biocides are classified in Annex V:

Main group 1: Disinfectants and general biocidal products

 Product-type 1: Human hygiene biocidal products
 Product-type 2: Private area and public health area disinfectants and other biocidal products
 Product-type 3: Veterinary hygiene biocidal products
 Product-type 4: Food and feed area disinfectants
 Product-type 5: Drinking water disinfectants

Main group 2: Preservatives

 Product-type 6: In-can preservatives
 Product-type 7: Film preservatives
 Product-type 8: Wood preservatives
 Product-type 9: Fibre, leather, rubber and polymerised materials preservatives
 Product-type 10: Masonry preservatives
 Product-type 11: Preservatives for liquid-cooling and processing systems
 Product-type 12: Slimicides
 Product-type 13: Metalworking-fluid preservatives

Main group 3: Pest control

 Product-type 14: Rodenticides
 Product-type 15: Avicides
 Product-type 16: Molluscicides
 Product-type 17: Piscicides
 Product-type 18: Insecticides, acaricides and products to control other arthropods
 Product-type 19: Repellents and attractants

Main group 4: Other biocidal products

 Product-type 20: Preservatives for food or feedstocks
 Product-type 21: Antifouling products
 Product-type 22: Embalming and taxidermist fluids
 Product-type 23: Control of other vertebrates

References

External links 
 "The Biocidal Products Regulations (BPR)", Health and Safety Executive (HSE)

European Union directives
1998 in law
1998 in the European Union